Pima is a genus of snout moths described by George Duryea Hulst in 1888.

Species
Pima albiplagiatella (Packard, 1874)
Pima albocostalialis (Hulst, 1886)
Pima boisduvaliella Guenée, 1845
Pima difficilis de Joannis, 1927
Pima fergusoni Neunzig, 2003
Pima flavidorsella de Joannis, 1927
Pima fosterella Hulst, 1888
Pima fulvirugella (Ragonot, 1887)
Pima granitella (Ragonot, 1887)
Pima occidentalis Heinrich, 1956
Pima parkerella (Schaus, 1924)

References

 
Phycitini
Pyralidae genera
Taxa named by George Duryea Hulst